Anastasios Orlandos (23 December 1887 – 6 October 1979) was a Greek architect and historian of architecture.

Biography
A descendant of Ioannis Orlandos, Anastasios was born and died in Athens. He studied as a civil engineer in the National Technical University of Athens, and completed his studies in archaeology at the University of Athens, where he later served as a professor. He was among the leading researchers in ancient and Byzantine architecture, and responsible for the restoration of many ancient and medieval monuments throughout the country. He was also chairman of the Academy of Athens in 1950, and from 1951 until his death secretary of the Archaeological Society of Athens.

Writings 
 Το αέτωμα του εν Σουνίω ναού του Ποσειδώνος. in: Archaiologikon Deltion 1, 1915, 1-27.
 Ο εν στρατώ της Ακαρνανίας ναός του Διός, 1924
 Μοναστηριακή αρχιτεκτονική. 1927, 2nd Edition 1958
 Monuments byzantines de Chios. 1930
 Μεσαιωνικά μνημεία της πεδιάδος των Αθηνών και των κλιτυών Υμηττού – Πεντελικού, Πάρνηθος και Αιγάλεω, 1933
 Συμβολή στη βυζαντινή αρχιτεκτονική. 1937
 Αρχείον των βυζαντινών μνημείων της Ελλάδος. 12 volumes, 1937–1973
 Η ξυλόστεγος παλαιοχριστιανική βασιλική της μεσογειακής λεκάνης. 3 volumes, 1952–1954
 Τα υλικά δομής των αρχαίων Ελλήνων και οι τρόποι εφαρμογής αυτών κατά τους συγγραφείς, τας επιγραφάς και τα μνημεία, 1955
 Η Παρηγορήτισσα της Άρτης. 1963
 Les matériaux de construction et la technique architecturale des anciens Grecs. 2 volumes, de Boccard, Paris 1966–1968.
 Η αρχιτεκτονική του Παρθενώνος. 3 volumes, 1977
 Λεξικόν αρχαίων ελληνικών αρχιτεκτονικών όρων. 1986

References

External links 
 Library and Information Centre of the University of Crete 
 Dictionary of Art Historians: Anastasios Orlandos
 Biblionet database entry 

1887 births
1979 deaths
Architects from Athens
Archaeologists from Athens
Greek Byzantinists
National Technical University of Athens alumni
Academic staff of the National and Kapodistrian University of Athens
Members of the Academy of Athens (modern)
Members of the Académie des Inscriptions et Belles-Lettres
Chevaliers of the Légion d'honneur
Architectural historians
Herder Prize recipients
20th-century archaeologists
Byzantine archaeologists